Dirty Angels is an upcoming American action thriller film directed by Martin Campbell, with a script co-written by Alissa Sullivan, Jonas McCord and Gene Quintano. It will star Eva Green, Ruby Rose, Maria Bakalova, Rona-Lee Shimon, Jonica T. Gibbs and Christopher Backus.

Plot
During the U.S. withdrawal from Afghanistan in 2021, a group of female soldiers providing medical relief are sent back in to rescue a group of kidnapped boys and girls caught between ISIS and the Taliban.

Cast
Eva Green as Jake
Ruby Rose
Maria Bakalova as The Bomb
Rona-Lee Shimon
Jonica T. Gibbs
Christopher Backus as Travis
Laëtitia Eïdo as Awina
Zoha Rahman

Production
In September 2022, it was announced that Martin Campbell would be directing the film, with Eva Green attached to star. In November, it was reported that Ruby Rose, Maria Bakalova, Rona-Lee Shimon and Jonica T. Gibbs had joined the cast. Christopher Backus joined the film's cast in December.

Principal photography began in December 2022 in Morocco and Millennium Media's Nu Boyana Studio in Thessaloniki, Greece, and concluded in February 2023.

References

External links

Upcoming films
American action adventure films
American action thriller films
Films directed by Martin Campbell
War in Afghanistan (2001–2021) films
Films shot in Greece
Films shot in Morocco
Films shot in Thessaloniki
Films set in Afghanistan
Films set in 2021
2020s English-language films
2020s American films